Bedellia boehmeriella is a moth of the family Bedelliidae. It was first described by Otto Swezey in 1912. It is endemic to the Hawaiian island of Oahu.

The larvae feed on Boehmeria grandis. They mine the leaves of their host plant. Full-grown larvae are about 6 mm long. When full grown the larva emerges from the leaf and pupates on the underside of the leaf beside a rib after having spun a few fibers of silk in which to fasten itself. The pupa is about 4.5 mm long. The pupal period lasts about 9 days.

External links

Bedelliidae
Endemic moths of Hawaii